The showy leopard frog (Lithobates spectabilis) is a species of frog in the family Ranidae endemic to Mexico.

Its natural habitats are subtropical or tropical moist montane forests, freshwater lakes, and water storage areas. It is threatened by habitat loss.

References

  (1983): Phylogeny and biogeography of the Rana pipiens complex: A biochemical evaluation. Systematic Zoology' 32: 132–143.
  (1985): Three new species of leopard frogs (Rana pipiens complex) from the Mexican Plateau. Occ. Pap. Mus. Nat. Hist. Univ. Kansas 117: 1–14.
  (1988): Systematics of the Rana pipiens complex: Puzzle and paradigm. Annual Review of Systematics and Ecology 19: 39–63.
  (2005): Phylogeny of the New World true frogs (Rana). Mol. Phylogenet. Evol. 34(2): 299–314.   PDF fulltext. 
  (2007) Constraints in naming parts of the Tree of Life. Mol. Phylogenet. Evol.'' 42: 331–338.

Lithobates
Endemic amphibians of Mexico
Taxonomy articles created by Polbot
Amphibians described in 1985
Fauna of the Trans-Mexican Volcanic Belt